R Radhakrishnan (born 9 June 1971) is an Indian member of parliament (MP) and former speaker of the Union Territory of Puducherry assembly from 2006 to 2011. He is a member of the All India N R Congress (AINRC) and represents Puducherry constituency in the Lok Sabha from 2014 to 2019.

Family and education

R Radhakrishnan hails from a family with political lineage. He is the elder son of politician R. Ramanathan (former member of Puducherry legislative assembly).

R Radhakrishnan completed his High school at ARLM Matriculation school, Cuddalore & Higher secondary Education at Campion Anglo-Indian Higher Secondary school. Under graduation in Commerce from Vivekananda College, Chennai. He completed his post-graduation in Master of Business Administration (MBA) from PSG Institute of Management in Coimbatore, which counts him as one of its distinguished alumni.

Political career

R Radhakrishnan was elected member of Puducherry Assembly twice following his election from the erstwhile Kuruvinatham constituency in 2001 and successively in 2006.

R Radhakrishnan was the Chairman of Puducherry Slum clearance Board from 2001-2006. He served as speaker of the Puducherry assembly from 2006 until 2011.

R Radhakrishnan was candidate for All India NR Congress (AINRC) from Puducherry in the Indian general election. He won with a margin of 60,854 defeating union minister of state V Narayanasamy of Indian National Congress in the 2014 Indian election.

References

1971 births
Living people
India MPs 2014–2019
Lok Sabha members from Puducherry
Puducherry MLAs 2001–2006
People from Kanchipuram district
All India NR Congress politicians
Puducherry MLAs 2006–2011
Speakers of Puducherry Legislative Assembly